Samuel Leech (1798–1848) was a young sailor in the Royal Navy and the United States Navy during the War of 1812. He became notable as one of very few who wrote an account of his experiences, titled, in the manner of the time, Thirty Years from Home, or a Voice from the Main Deck; Being the Experience of Samuel Leech, Who Was Six Years in the British and American Navies: Was Captured in the British Frigate Macedonian: Afterwards Entered the American Navy, and Was Taken in the United States Brig Syren, by the British Ship Medway.

Leech's nautical career began in 1810, at the age of thirteen, when Lord William FitzRoy agreed to take Samuel into his frigate , as a favor to FitzRoy's sister Frances, the wife of Francis Spencer, 1st Baron Churchill, Leech being the son of one of her servants.

As a prisoner of war, he was due to be exchanged at some point, but when the captured Macedonian was brought into Newport, Rhode Island, Leech jumped ship.

After failing to gain steady work on land, he returned to the sea, this time signing on to the US Navy, where he compared his treatment favorably to that in the Royal Navy. His imprisonment seems not to have been too uncomfortable, and did not last long in any case, since the war ended the following year. He was in  subsequently.

Around 1816 he went ashore, where he worked at various jobs and joined the Methodist Church. He eventually accumulated enough money to go into business for himself, and became a merchant living in Wilbraham, Massachusetts with a wife and three children.

Many years later he revisited , now a US ship, when it was in port in New York (probably 1840), and reminisced with the sailors there. Perhaps this encounter inspired his book, which was published by Tappen & Dennet in 1843.

References

 Samuel Leech, A Voice from the Main Deck: Being a Record of the Thirty Years' Adventures of Samuel Leech (Naval Institute Press, 1999) hardcover , paperback 
 James T. de Kay, Chronicles of the Frigate Macedonian (W.W. Norton, New York, 1995)

External links
 A Voice from the Main Deck
 Leech's account of the battle between HMS Macedonian and USS United States

1798 births
1848 deaths
Royal Navy sailors
United States Navy sailors
People from Wanstead
People from Wilbraham, Massachusetts